Golden Rainbow is a Broadway musical that opened in 1968. It starred Steve Lawrence and Eydie Gormé until it closed in early 1969.

The previews for Golden Rainbow began at the Forrest Theatre in Philadelphia on November 28, 1967, moving to its new location in New York City at the Shubert Theatre on Broadway on December 27, 1967. The musical officially opened on February 4, 1968, at the Shubert, where it played until November 17, 1968. On November 19, 1968, its run resumed at the George Abbott Theatre on Broadway, where Golden Rainbow played until it closed on January 11, 1969, after 43 previews and 383 performances.

The stars of Golden Rainbow, Steve Lawrence and Eydie Gormé, were already well known from their extensive work in music, film and television during the 1950s and 1960s. The musical featured the song "I've Gotta Be Me", released as a single in the late 1960s by both Lawrence and Sammy Davis Jr.. The Osmond Brothers sang the title song "Golden Rainbow" on the March 22, 1970, episode of The Magical World of Disney.

Author William Goldman wrote a chapter about Golden Rainbow in his book The Season: A Candid Look at Broadway, which was written while the show was preparing for Broadway. The chapter, titled "Washing Garbage," stated that the material suffered from attempts to bring it up to expected levels.

The music and lyrics for Golden Rainbow were by Walter Marks; the book was by Ernest Kinoy; and the musical was based on the film adaptation (by screenwriter Arnold Schulman) of the play A Hole in the Head. Although the musical did not win any Tony Awards, actor Scott Jacoby was nominated for Best Featured Actor in a Musical, and Robert Randolph was nominated for Best Scenic Design.

Synopsis
The show concerns a man living in Las Vegas, Nevada and raising his son alone; his late wife's sister arrives and tries to bring stability to the boy's life, but unintentionally falls in love with her brother-in-law.

Musical numbers

Act I
 "Overture" - Orchestra
 "Golden Rainbow" - Las Vegas
 "We Got Us" - Larry and Ally
 He Needs Me Now" - Judy
 "Kid" - Larry
 "For Once in Your Life" - Judy, Larry and the boys
 "Taking Care of You" - Judy, Ally and Friends
 "I've Got to Be Me" - Larry

Act II
 "Entr'acte" - Orchestra
 "The Fall of Babylon" - Babylonians
 "Taste" - Lou and friends
 "Desert Moon" - Larry and Judy
 "All in Fun" - Larry and Judy
 "It's You Again" - Judy
 "I've Got to Be Me (Reprise)" - Larry
 "How Can I Be So Wrong?" - Judy
 "We Got Us (Reprise)" - Larry, Judy and Ally
 "Finale" - Company

References

External links

 
  (archive)

Broadway musicals
1968 musicals
Musicals based on films